Sivells Bend is an unincorporated community on Farm to Market Road 1201 just four miles south of the Oklahoma border and 20 miles north of the county seat, Gainesville, in Cooke County, Texas, United States.

History
Early settlers from Kentucky Town, Texas, arrived in 1850 and established a general store, but north-central Texas was still under constant threat from Native American attacks, so settlers abandoned the store.  Around 1860, settlers returned to stay and established a farming community.  During the Civil War, a company of Confederate soldiers was stationed at Sivells Bend to prevent aggression from across the Red River.  As the Chisholm Trail came through north-central Texas in the early 1870s, a small branch of the trail went through the Sivells Bend area.  The arrival of cowpunchers led to development, and by 1872, Sivells Bend had a post office.  By 1900, the small community reported a population of 100 with various stores, physicians, cotton gins, and a small school, but its remote location, the growth of Gainesville, and the lack of a railroad or major highway hindered further development.  Even the discovery of oil in the area could not abate the decline.  The post office closed in 1973, but the small community retains two churches, several homes, and its independent school (though high school students are bused to nearby Muenster).

Education
Sivells Bend is served by the Sivells Bend Independent School District (grades K-8) and the Muenster Independent School District (grades 9-12).

References

Unincorporated communities in Texas
Unincorporated communities in Cooke County, Texas